Aleksandar Stepanovich (born September 25, 1981) is a former American football center. He was drafted by the Arizona Cardinals in the fourth round of the 2004 NFL Draft. He played college football at Ohio State. Stepanovich has also played for the Cincinnati Bengals, Atlanta Falcons, and Pittsburgh Steelers.

Early years
In 2000, Stepanovich graduated from Berea High School in Berea, Ohio. He was also an accomplished wrestler in high school, winning the heavyweight state championship in 2000 and runner-up in 1999. Nationally ranked wrestler throughout high school, multiple MVP's in national and state tourneys along with two Pioneer Conference MVP's.
One of the best OL in the country during his junior and senior years, made numerous All-American teams along with being well decorated with numerous awards throughout his career.

College career
Well respected amongst his teammates, known for his work ethic and toughness, regarded as one of the top centers in college football during 2001 and 2002 at The Ohio State University, he shifted to guard in his senior campaign and started 26 games during his college football career. All-Big Ten and All-American performer. 4 year lettermen while at OSU, his career culminated with a Buckeye tree being planted in his honor in Buckeye Grove joining all other first-team All-Americans at OSU.

Professional career

Arizona Cardinals
The Cardinals selected him in the fourth round of the 2004 NFL Draft and Stepanovich moved into the starting lineup. He started every game for the Cardinals in 2004 without missing a single offensive snap and made several All-Rookie teams, along with being the 1st rookie center in franchise history to start all 16 games..  He continued as a starter for much of 2005 and 2006 before going on injured reserve.

The Cardinals elected not to tender him an offer for 2007, making him an unrestricted free agent.

Cincinnati Bengals
In March, the Cincinnati Bengals signed Stepanovich to a one-year deal for 2007. He played in all 16 games and started 5.

Atlanta Falcons
On March 10, 2008, Stepanovich was signed by the Atlanta Falcons to a three-year deal. He was released on June 17, 2009.

Pittsburgh Steelers
Stepanovich signed with the Pittsburgh Steelers on August 10, 2009. He was waived on August 31.
Injuries forced his time in Pittsburgh and career short.

References

External links
Arizona Cardinals bio
Pittsburgh Steelers bio

1981 births
Living people
American football centers
American people of Serbian descent
Arizona Cardinals players
Atlanta Falcons players
Cincinnati Bengals players
Hartford Colonials players
Ohio State Buckeyes football players
People from Berea, Ohio
Pittsburgh Steelers players
Players of American football from Ohio
Sportspeople from Cuyahoga County, Ohio